Sri Venkateswara Temple of North Carolina is a Hindu Temple located in Cary, North Carolina and serves the estimated 21,000  Hindus in the Research Triangle area. The temple is "dedicated to promoting the Hindu religion and humanitarian services across the Triangle."

History
Starting in 1988, there was a growing demand by South Indians, living in the Research Triangle, for an alternative South Indian-style temple. The only Hindu Temple in the area was an eclectic Hindu Temple in Morrisville. In July 1998, a couple bought  of undeveloped land at 21 Balaji Place, Cary. On Jan 1999, a Bhoomi Puja was held to purify the land and allow construction to begin. In 2002, Cary approved zoning for the construction of a Hindu temple. However, the group had to raise the funds for its construction.

Construction 

By 2007, the plans and design for Sri Venkateswara Temple were finalized, and construction began in April 2009. Fourteen artisans were brought in from India to hand carve the temple's decorative Hindu idols out of cement. Engineer Nand Gopal Sachdeva was the main builder; he worked free of charge and billed other expenses at cost. Without his generosity, the Temple would have cost six million dollars but ended up only costing $3.5 million. The Temple was completed in May 2009.

Consecration 
On May 29, 2009, Prana Pratishtha, a ceremony dedicated to inviting a deity to live in the temple, was held and the temple was open the following day. The Temple was dedicated to Sri Venkateswara, the god of wealth and well being.

The opening ceremony of the Sri Venkateswara Temple was attended by over 10,000 guests including several politicians. The total cost of the opening ceremony and consecration was over $1 million.

Growth 
Governor Roy Cooper signed a Diwali Proclamation, for the first time in the history of North Carolina, at Sri Venkateswara Temple North Carolina October 18, 2017. The next day, for Diwali, there was a celebration at the governor's mansion in Raleigh, which ended with ending Chakrapani Kumara, the SV Temples priest, offering prayers.

Design
The Temple is modeled after the famous Sri Venkateswara Temple in Tirupathi in the state of Andhra Pradesh, India. Bhaskar Venepalli, a member of the SV Temple board of trustees, say “That temple is very powerful, and actually as powerful as the Vatican. People stand in lines for several hours to go into the temple. In that context, it is very unique.”

The temple's design includes Murtis, Hindu Idols common in Hinduism sects practiced in Southern India.  The temple's floors are black granite.

Other structures 
The property purchased for the Temple included the Nancy Jones House, the oldest building in Cary. In 2019, the Town of Cary bought the Nancy Jones House, from Sri Venkateswara Temple, NC for $100,000 with plans of moving it off of Temple Grounds. Cary purchased the structure for its historical preservation.

References

External links 

 

Buildings and structures in Wake County, North Carolina
Hinduism in the United States
Religious buildings and structures completed in 2009
2009 establishments in North Carolina
Religious organizations established in 1998
Buildings and structures in Cary, North Carolina
Indian-American culture in North Carolina
Asian-American culture in North Carolina
Hindu temples